Tanitoluwa Oluwatimikhin "Tani" Oluwaseyi (born 15 May 2000) is a Nigerian footballer who currently plays as a forward for Major League Soccer side Minnesota United.

Career

Youth
Oluwaseyi was born in Abuja, Nigeria, but moved to Mississauga, Ontario in Canada at a young age. Here he attended St. Joan of Arc Catholic Secondary School. At St. Joan of Arc, he captained the Angels to a 17–0 record and a Provincial High School Championship as a senior he scored 30 goals and tallied ten assists while serving as a team captain. He was also a three-time MVP of the boys soccer team, scoring a total of 68 times over a four-year career. While at high school, Oluwaseyi also played club soccer for the GPS Academy, where he won the Golden Boot Award at the 2017 Super Cup in Northern Ireland, at which him team won the Vase Cup. He also led his team to Ontario Academy Soccer League and Provincial Indoor Soccer League Championships.

College & Amateur
In 2018, Oluwaseyi committed to playing college soccer at St. John's University. In a four year college career, Oluwaseyi went on to make 49 appearances, scoring 20 goals and tallying ten assists. He missed nearly all his entire senior season, and his sophomore season was truncated by the COVID-19 pandemic. However, he earned numerous college accolades, including BIG EAST All-Freshman Team selection in 2018, BIG EAST Offensive Player of the Year, First Team All-BIG EAST, and United Soccer Coaches First Team All-Atlantic Region in 2019, and First Team All-BIG EAST, and United Soccer Coaches All-East Region Second Team in the 2020–21 season.

In his senior year, Oluwaseyi also appeared for local side Manhattan SC in the USL League Two, where he scored a single goal during his two appearances. He also played with New York Pancyprian-Freedoms, who compete in the fifth-tier EPSL. He was also named on the roster for NPSL side FC Golden State, but didn't make an appearance.

Professional
In January 2022, it was announced Oluwaseyi would be available in the 2022 MLS SuperDraft.

On 11 January 2022, he was selected 17th overall by Minnesota United. On 25 February, Oluwaseyi signed a one-year deal with Minnesota. During the 2022 season, he spent time with Minnesota United 2 in MLS Next Pro. In November 2022 Minnesota announced they had exercised Oluwaseyi's contract option, keeping him at the club through 2023.

References

External links

2000 births
Living people
People from Abuja
Nigerian footballers
Canadian soccer players
Nigerian emigrants to Canada
Association football forwards
Major League Soccer players
Minnesota United FC draft picks
Minnesota United FC players
MLS Next Pro players
St. John's Red Storm men's soccer players
USL League Two players
Nigerian expatriate footballers
Nigerian expatriate sportspeople in the United States
Canadian expatriate soccer players
Canadian expatriate sportspeople in the United States
College men's soccer players in the United States
Expatriate soccer players in the United States